The Corridor First type of railway coach was one of the standard mid-20th century designs; coded 'FK' by the LNER and BR, and 'CL' by the LMS. The layout of the coach was a number of compartments, all of which were first class, linked by a side corridor.
The British Railways produced versions (of Mark 1 and Mark 2 variations up to Mark 2D inclusive) were numbered in the 13xxx series. The prototype Mark 2 carriage, number 13252, was of FK design. It is now preserved at the Mid-Norfolk Railway, having been preserved by (now formerly part of) the National Collection.

A number of the Mark 2A/2B/2C carriages were declassified in 1985 to become Standard Corridors (coded SK). They were renumbered from 13xxx to 19xxx, putting them after the end of the 'Mark 1' range (19452–19560).

No carriages of this type are still in daily use on the main line network, since open saloon carriages are now preferred by operating companies. However, some electric multiple units based on British Rail coaches have first class compartments. As of 22 May 2010 there are no more Mark 1-based class units in use (the last journey was on the train which left  on Saturday 22 May 2010 at 22:14 BST). Hastings Diesels Limited has some such coaches forming part of their preserved main line Class 201/202 and many FKs still operate in charter trains, and they remain popular on preserved railway lines.

Gallery

Orders

See also
Corridor coach

British Rail coaching stock